Poag and McEwen are a developer, manager, and leaser of lifestyle centers in the United States.  They are recognized as one of the founders of the concept.  They are based out of Memphis, TN.

Developments Under Construction
The Promenade Shops at Orchard Valley | Manteca, CA
The Promenade Shops at The Spectrum | Pearland, TX
Highland Row | Memphis, TN

Existing Poag & McEwen Developments
The Promenade Shops at Dos Lagos | Corona, CA
The Promenade Shops at Briargate | Colorado Springs, CO
The Promenade Shops at Centerra | Loveland, CO
The Promenade Shops at Saucon Valley | Lehigh Valley (Center Valley), PA
The Promenade Shops at Evergreen Walk | South Windsor, CT
Aspen Grove | Littleton, CO
Town Center Plaza | Leawood, KS
One Pacific Place| Omaha, NE
Deer Park Town Center | Deer Park, IL, IL
The Shops at Perry Crossing | Plainfield, IN

References

External links
Poag and McEwen Official Web Site.

Shopping center management firms